WQKT is a commercial FM radio station in Wooster, Ohio, United States, broadcasting at 104.5 MHz with a country music format. The station carries Cleveland Guardians baseball, Cleveland Browns football, Cleveland Cavaliers basketball, Ohio State University football and basketball, football and basketball games of The College of Wooster, along with various local High School sports broadcasts. WQKT is co-owned with AM station WKVX.

WQKT FM began broadcasting as WWST-FM and for many years rebroadcasting the programming of its sister AM station WWST.  The station signed on in 1947 at 5,000 watts while playing block programming.  In 1962 in the wave of Rock Music broadcasting on the radio, WWST followed suit until the 1980s when it began Country Programming.  It changed to WQKT on October 10, 1983 when it adopted its present country music format now using Westwood One's Mainstream Country feed.

External links
Station History from WQKT Website

QKT
College of Wooster